Kimberly High School may refer to:

Kimberly High School (Idaho), in Kimberly, Idaho
Kimberly High School (Wisconsin), in Kimberly, Wisconsin

See also
Kimberley Boys' High School, Kimberley, Northern Cape, South Africa
Kimberley Girls' High School, Kimberley, Northern Cape, South Africa